Saint James is an unincorporated community in Wheatland Township, Fayette County, Illinois, United States.

Geography

References 

Unincorporated communities in Fayette County, Illinois
Unincorporated communities in Illinois